Ould Yenge  is a town and commune in Mauritania.

Communes of Mauritania
Mali–Mauritania border crossings